The 1969–70 Drexel Dragons men's basketball team represented Drexel Institute of Technology during the 1969–70 men's basketball season. The Dragons, led by 2nd year head coach Frank Szymanski, played their home games at the 32nd Street Armory and were members of the College–Southern division of the Middle Atlantic Conferences (MAC).

The team finished the season 11–11.

Roster

Schedule

|-
!colspan=9 style="background:#F8B800; color:#002663;"| Regular season
|-

References

Drexel Dragons men's basketball seasons
Drexel
1969 in sports in Pennsylvania
1970 in sports in Pennsylvania